Shane O'Neill (born 1972) is an American tattoo artist in Middletown, Delaware. He is best known for winning the first season of the Spike TV show Ink Master and he is nationally recognized for being an expert in Black-and-gray portraits and realism tattoos.

History
O'Neill attended the University of the Arts in Philadelphia, where he earned a Bachelor of Fine Arts. He then worked as a freelance illustrator. He began tattooing in 1997, with his artwork being featured in tattoo magazines Tattoo Society, Rise Magazine, and Wet Red Ink.

During Ink Master, O'Neill was never in the bottom three contestants or up for elimination except in the final episode where only three contestants were left. He won Best Tattoo of the Week honors in episodes 3, 6 and 7. In the final episode, O'Neill produced a Japanese style tattoo and a colored skull tattoo and won.

In March 2012, the Middletown Town Council gave a proclamation in honor of O'Neill's win. Also in 2012, he participated as a member of the jury for the Chaudesaigues Award, which recognizes excellence in tattooing.

O'Neill has been featured at as a high profile guest at many tattoo conventions and even organized tattoo conventions himself. In February 2012, he organized a "Best in the MidWest" convention in Council Bluffs, Iowa and in July 2013, he organized "The Gambling Rose" convention in Cincinnati. He also launched his own company, System One Tattoo Products, which sells items related to tattoo care and piercing.

Personal life
O'Neill lives in Middletown, Delaware with his wife and three daughters.

References

American tattoo artists
People from Middletown, Delaware
Living people
1972 births
University of the Arts (Philadelphia) alumni
Participants in American reality television series
Reality show winners
Ink Master